Jorge Berrio is a former Argentine association football defender who played five seasons in the North American Soccer League.

In 1979, Berrio signed with the Memphis Rogues of the North American Soccer League.  In the fall of 1980, he moved to the Jacksonville Tea Men and played the 1980–1981 NASL indoor season followed by two outdoor NASL seasons.  In 1983, the Tea Men moved to the second division American Soccer League, winning the title.  He then played one NASL indoor season with the Tulsa Roughnecks in 1983–1984.  In 1984, Berrio played one last season with the Tea Men, this time in the United Soccer League.

References

External links
 NASL stats

1951 births
Living people
American Soccer League (1933–1983) players
Argentine footballers
Argentine expatriate footballers
Jacksonville Tea Men players
Memphis Rogues players
North American Soccer League (1968–1984) indoor players
North American Soccer League (1968–1984) players
Tulsa Roughnecks (1978–1984) players
United Soccer League (1984–85) players
Association football defenders